Erich Neumann (23 January 1905 – 5 November 1960) was a German psychologist, philosopher, writer, and student of Carl Jung.

Career
Neumann was born in Berlin to a Jewish family. He received his PhD in Philosophy from the University of Erlangen–Nuremberg in 1927 and then continued to study medicine at the University of Berlin, where he acquired his first degree in medicine in 1933. In 1934 Neumann and his wife Julie, who had been Zionists since they were teenagers, spurred on by fear of persecution of Jews by the Nazi government, moved to Tel Aviv. For many years, he regularly returned to Zürich, Switzerland to give lectures at the C. G. Jung Institute.  He also lectured frequently in England, France and the Netherlands, and was a member of the International Association for Analytical Psychology and president of the Israel Association of Analytical Psychologists. He practiced analytical psychology in Tel Aviv from 1934 until his death from kidney cancer in 1960.

Contributions

Neumann contributed to the field of developmental psychology and the psychology of consciousness and creativity.  He had a theoretical and philosophical approach to analysis, contrasting with the more clinical concern in England and the United States. His most valuable contribution to psychology was the empirical concept of "centroversion", a synthesis of extra- and introversion. However, he is best known for his theory of feminine development, a theory formulated in numerous publications, most notably The Great Mother.

Works
His most enduring contributions to Jungian thought are The Origins and History of Consciousness (1949) and The Great Mother (1955). Another work, Depth Psychology and a New Ethic, reflects on human destructiveness and the way the human mind relates to its own shadow.

Neumann further developed his studies in feminine archetypes in his Art and the Creative Unconscious, The Fear of the Feminine, and Amor and Psyche.

Neumann also wrote poetry, a novel called The Beginning (Der Anfang), and in 1932 conducted a critical study of Franz Kafka's works at a time when Kafka was still a minor figure in the literary world.

Bibliography 
 Tiefenpsychologie und neue Ethik.  Rhein, Zürich 1949
 Ursprungsgeschichte des Bewusstseins. Mit einem Vorwort von C.G. Jung. Rascher, Zürich, 1949
 Amor und Psyche. 1952
 Umkreisung der Mitte. 3 Bde., 1953/54
 Die große Mutter. Der Archetyp des großen Weiblichen. Rhein, Zürich 1956
 Der schöpferische Mensch. 1959
 Die archetypische Welt Henry Moores. 1961, posthum veröffentlicht
 Krise und Erneuerung. 1961, posthum veröffentlicht
 Das Kind. Struktur und Dynamik der werdenden Persönlichkeit. 1963, posthum 1980 veröffentlicht
 Jacob et Esaü: L'archétype des frères ennemis, un symbole du judaïsme, posthum 2015. French translation of Jacob and Esau. Reflection on the Brother Motif, (c) Chiron Publications.

See also
 Eternal feminine
 Matriarchal religion
 Mother goddess
 Sexual Personae

Citations

General references 
 
 Neumann, Erich. Depth Psychology and a New Ethic. Shambhala; Reprint edition (1990). .
 Neumann, Erich. The Child. English translation by Ralph Manheim, C.G. Jung Foundation for Analytical Psychology, Inc.; Hodder and Stoughton (1973). .
 Ortíz-Osés, Andrés. La Diosa madre. Trotta; (1996).

External links
 Erich Neumann: Theorist of the Great Mother by Camille Paglia
  C. G. Jung and Erich Neumann: The Zaddik, Sophia, and the Shekinah, by Lance S. Owens
 Art and the Creative Unconscious
 The Great Mother
 Origins and History of Consciousness - Volume II

1905 births
1960 deaths
20th-century German novelists
20th-century German poets
20th-century non-fiction writers
20th-century psychologists
Comparative mythologists
German consciousness researchers and theorists
Deaths from cancer in Israel
Deaths from kidney cancer
Developmental psychologists
Feminist philosophers
Feminist psychologists
Feminist spirituality
Feminist theologians
Feminist writers
Franz Kafka scholars
German feminists
German male novelists
German male poets
German non-fiction writers
German philosophers
German psychoanalysts
German psychologists
German Zionists
Humboldt University of Berlin alumni
Israeli feminists
Israeli non-fiction writers
Israeli novelists
Israeli philosophers
Israeli poets
Israeli psychologists
Jewish emigrants from Nazi Germany to Mandatory Palestine
Jungian psychologists
Male feminists
People from Tel Aviv
Psychology writers
Symbologists
University of Erlangen-Nuremberg alumni
Writers from Berlin